Xenapamea is a genus of moths of the family Noctuidae.

Species
 Xenapamea pacifica Sugi, 1970

References
Natural History Museum Lepidoptera genus database
Xenapamea at funet

Hadeninae